William Jesse Shirley (July 6, 1921 – August 27, 1989) was an American actor and tenor/lyric baritone singer who later became a Broadway theatre producer. He is perhaps best known as the speaking and singing voice of Prince Phillip in Walt Disney's 1959 animated classic Sleeping Beauty and for dubbing Jeremy Brett's singing voice in the 1964 film version of My Fair Lady.

Early years
William Jesse Shirley was born in Indianapolis, Indiana, on July 6, 1921. His father, Luther James Shirley, was a funeral director for Shirley Brothers Mortuaries. His mother, Inez Shirley (née Baldwin), was a well-known professional pianist. According to the Indianapolis Star, Inez first discovered her son's talent when he was around the age of five, when one day he began singing along to what she was playing on the piano. She directed him to the founder of the Ogden Chorale, who was taken with the child's vocal ability, expressive eyes, and "unusual personality" for a child of his age. From then on, Billy was known locally as a boy soprano and singing/acting prodigy. He was a very popular boy soloist with the Ogden Chorale, which sang at Christmas and Easter on the steps of the Soldiers' and Sailors' Monument. He performed with the Meglin Kiddies and was an active member of the Children's Civic Theater and the Irvington Playhouse.

At the age of eleven, he traveled with his family to California and was introduced to L. E. Behymer who arranged to introduce him to Sid Grauman. He listened to Billy sing, and the "boy with the golden voice" soon appeared in films by 20th Century Fox, Columbia and Paramount Studios. The family owned a dog, a Boston terrier named Buddy. During the time he stayed in California, little Billy often wrote letters home requesting news about his pet.

Some of the boy's first acting roles were in rare or hard-to-find films, such as The Phantom President (1932) and As The Devil Commands (1933). He sang Christmas carols in As The Devil Commands. Some press reports list the latter film's name as Acquitted, the name of a previous Columbia film from 1929.

Bill attended George W. Julian Elementary during his grade school years and attended Shortridge High School in adolescence. Among other things, he became a member of its student council along with such prominent figures as Madelyn Pugh and Kurt Vonnegut Jr.; he graduated in 1939. The following year, aged 19, Bill and his mother moved to Hollywood, where he studied voice and music at the Herbert Wall School of Music. His singing teacher there, the famous Andrés de Segurola, would accept Shirley as a pupil for no less than six months. Mrs. Shirley lived with her son in Hollywood for sixteen years, and the two went to Indiana to visit family and friends quite often.

He was a 1940 graduate of the Edward Clark Academy, a theater school in Hollywood.

In early 1941, Shirley was introduced to Republic Studios president Herbert Yates by a mutual friend who worked at the studio and remembered that Shirley used to sing as a child. Shirley sang a few numbers for Yates, and was immediately signed up for a seven-year contract.

Shirley's roles in the Republic films were usually very small or supporting. He had a small, yet somewhat important, part in Flying Tigers, as a very young pilot who is mortally wounded during his first mission. He appeared in other rare and usually B-list films, such as Doctors Don't Tell (1941), Rookies on Parade (1941), Hi'-Neighbor (1942), Ice-Capades Revue (1942), and Sailors on Leave (1941).

Career
After his Army service, he worked in radio and on Broadway. He regularly performed on stage, in summer stock, and on television. He appeared in nightclubs, including a six-week engagement at Monte Proser's famous Copacabana in early 1947, the Latin Quarter in New York, the Mocambo in Los Angeles, and the Tropicana and Riviera in Las Vegas.

He found work for radio station KFI on two shows called "Ladies Day" and "The Packard Hour". In 1949, he played Dutch Miller on "The Railroad Hour"'s presentation of Best Foot Forward, and played the role of the gondolier on episode of Ronald Colman's "Favorite Story" presentation of Edgar Allan Poe's "The Assignation". In 1947, he had a part in the musical "Look Ma I'm Dancin'!" as "Shauny O'Shay". During the tryout his part was cut severely, prompting him to leave the show. However, recordings of the production's soundtrack are still available that included Shirley's vocals, to avoid a potential musicians' strike. In late 1948, Darryl Zanuck received a Man-Of-The-Year award in a ceremony at the Mocambo. One scheduled singer was unable to appear, and asked Shirley to substitute for him.

Zanuck heard Bill sing and promptly put him under contract as a ghost singer for 20th Century-Fox. He dubbed vocals for films including Oh, You Beautiful Doll (1949) (Mark Stevens' singing voice) and Dancing In The Dark (1949), but was released by the studio for no known reason a few months later.

Although he had occasional vocal work, Shirley sometimes had difficulty furthering his career. For a while, Shirley performed often with singing actress Gale Robbins. In 1949, he starred with Robbins in the short-lived Broadway revue "A La Carte". He performed with her on an episode of Movietown Radio Theater (also known as Skippy Hollywood Theater) entitled "Show Business". In 1950, the pair performed as themselves on an episode of the Ed Wynn Show.

In 1952 he got his only leading role onscreen: as Stephen Foster in I Dream of Jeanie, although actor Ray Middleton received the top billing. The same year, he played Bruce Martingale, a singer at a local tavern, in Abbott and Costello Meet Captain Kidd. In late 1952, he joined a Hollywood USO troupe to entertain soldiers in Korea for the holidays. During this time, he came down with a throat infection which "worried" his doctors enough to press him to cancel shows pending a "possible" operation. Whether he underwent surgery or not, by February he had recovered enough to be reported past danger, and by April, he had recovered sufficiently enough to take on the role of Johann Strauss, Jr., in Edwin Lester's production of "The Great Waltz". Rehearsals began the following month.

He frequently performed with USO troupes, appearing with stars such as Debbie Reynolds and Keenan Wynn.

In November 1955, he appeared on Arthur Godfrey's "Talent Scouts" show and won first place, although this still did not bring about much publicity or notice that was not localized to his home state.

Sleeping Beauty
 Shirley was approached by the Walt Disney Company to provide the speaking and singing voice for the character of Prince Phillip in its animated version of Sleeping Beauty. Shirley's singing range was tenor/baritone, and had a youthful quality which was ideal for the voice of the young Prince Phillip. Before they were cast as the voices of Aurora and Phillip, Mary Costa and Shirley were asked to audition together to make sure their voices complemented each other. During the film's production, Shirley and actor Ed Kemmer were used by the Disney animators as live action reference models for Prince Phillip; the animators had them perform many of the sequences from the movie while they drew the character. He had many rehearsals with Mary Costa, who was also providing the voice for Princess Aurora.

They acted out their parts just as if they were to appear personally in the finished production. The two even kissed for the sound-track cameras. After their voices were recorded, the animators drew every motion of the characters' lips to fit each enunciated syllable from the actors' mouths, so that viewers would be able to "see" the voices and hear them. The animators would draw sixteen drawings for each syllable formed by the lips. Shirley would later remember that he said, "Whoa, Samson!" to a non-existent horse for a whole day before the sound engineers were satisfied with the inflection. And at that point, Samson had not even been sketched as a horse.

Shortly before the film was released, Shirley and Costa performed together at the Hollywood Bowl on a Disney themed night in 1958. 
In an interview, Costa recalled that she and the actresses playing the fairy godmothers (Verna Felton, Barbara Jo Allen, and Barbara Luddy) were endeared to Shirley, his good looks, and his shyness, adding that "we all had our crushes on him" and "he was so shy and we all had just genuine crushes on that Prince. He was really cute." In another interview she said, "We loved to tease him. Verna Felton who played Flora would always creep up behind him with a pencil and act like it was a baton [wand]. She'd do some fairy work on him and say he was going to be the greatest, handsomest, and all of this." Shirley and Costa sang the iconic song of the film,"Once Upon a Dream".

Besides the original, there is a version of the song that was unused and unpublished for the film. It contains rare vocals from both performers that differ slightly from those used in the finished product; this can easily be found on the Internet and the 1997 edition of the VHS. This version is widely considered by fans to be "prettier".

Additional work
Another famous vocal role of Shirley's (again as an uncredited ghost singer) was the singing voice of Freddy Eynsford-Hill (played by Jeremy Brett) in the Warner Bros. film of My Fair Lady. Shirley sang one of the film's most memorable songs, "On the Street Where You Live".  For a long while, Brett claimed that he himself had sung the song and that Mr. Shirley merely "sweetened the high tones." It was not until 1994 that Brett admitted that it was Shirley who sang the song, not him, although Brett claimed that he knew nothing about it until the opening night.

Shirley performed in several Starlight Musical Theater Company productions, such as "The Great Waltz" (1953), a play in which he portrayed Johann "Schani" Strauss II. Florence Henderson was featured as the composer's love interest. Bill became exceptionally popular with Sacramento's Music Circus, as reported by such news items as the Sacramento Bee. Older newspaper reports confirm that he apparently received much acclaim for his acting and singing, especially in his portrayals of Johann Strauss Jr. of "The Great Waltz", and Lt. Joseph Cable of "South Pacific".

During the early 1950s, he was a regular guest on Bekins "Hollywood Music Hall" with actress Lucille Norman, who had worked with him on "Sweethearts on Parade".

According to reports, Bill Shirley offered his services for humanitarian aid efforts. Some of these include funds and telethons, such as a benefit baseball game for the Marion County Society for Crippled Children and Adults in 1952, and the groundbreaking ceremony for the Indianapolis Community Hospital, alongside Jean Hersholt and then-Vice President Richard M. Nixon in 1954.

Bill Shirley is often stated to have retired from acting in 1963. However, he was a member of the Actors' Equity Association and continued to perform well after 1963, especially in industrial shows such as “Diesel Dazzle” and “A Step Ahead” in 1966, and returned to play Nat Miller in a Music Circus production of “Take Me Along” in 1975. He had co-produced "Dames At Sea", which introduced Bernadette Peters, in the 1960s.

It is probable that Shirley's credits are innumerable, but yet unknown as he often received little or no credit for his work.

Death
For the last ten years of his life, he worked with Litton Industries in the real estate department, primarily in Beverly Hills. He retired from the company in May 1989, three months before his death from lung cancer, at age 68 on August 27, 1989, at the Guardian Convalescent Hospital in Los Angeles. He was interred in Indianapolis's Crown Hill Cemetery.

Filmography
The Phantom President (1932) – Bit  
As the Devil Commands (1933) – Orphan
Rookies on Parade (1941) – Bill
Ice-Capades (1941) – bit role (uncredited)
Doctors Don't Tell (1941) – Tom Wayne 
Sailors on Leave (1941) – Bill Carstairs 
Mercy Island (1941) – Guide (uncredited)
Hi, Neighbor (1942) – Dick
Flying Tigers (1942) – Dale 
Ice-Capades Revue (1942) – Denny 
Three Little Sisters (1944) – Pvt. Ferguson (as William Shirley)
Dancing in the Dark (1949) – Singer of title song over opening credits (uncredited)
Oh, You Beautiful Doll (1949) – dubbed singing voice for Mark Stevens (uncredited)
Come to the Stable (1949) – Male tenor singer with Twentieth Century-Fox Studio Orchestra (movie trailer only, unseen, uncredited) 
Nancy Goes to Rio (1950) – Dubbed voice of tenor in operetta – (uncredited)
The Ed Wynn Show (S1 Episode 27) (1950) – Himself
With a Song in My Heart (1952) – (partially dubbed singing voice for Richard Allan; uncredited)
I Dream of Jeanie (1952) – Stephen Foster 
Abbott and Costello Meet Captain Kidd (1952) – Bruce Martingale 
Sweethearts on Parade (1953) – Bill Gamble 
Sleeping Beauty (1959) – Prince Phillip (voice)
My Fair Lady (1964) – Freddy Eynsford-Hill (singing voice, uncredited)

References

External links

1921 births
1989 deaths
20th-century American male actors
20th-century American singers
American male film actors
American male musical theatre actors
Burials at Crown Hill Cemetery
Deaths from lung cancer in California
Male actors from Indianapolis
Musicians from Indianapolis
Shortridge High School alumni
United States Army personnel of World War II
United States Army soldiers
American male voice actors